Queen Mary's College (QMC) is a sixth form college in Basingstoke, Hampshire, England.
The college's name is from the former grammar school Queen Mary's School in the northern part of Basingstoke. The college is located in the former school buildings of the Shrubbery All Girls secondary modern, which date back to the early 1950s.

As of 2019, the college is managed and run as an academy, by the single academy trust North Hampshire Education Trust.

College Site
The college was opened in 1972. A majority of the college's classrooms are housed in a single, two-storey, wide spread main building with a few smaller buildings providing most of the rest of the teaching space. ICT & Art (and related subjects) are housed in The Allen Building, a £6m 3-storey teaching block completed in 2005. Science, English, Modern Foreign Languages and Foundation Learning takes place in a multimillion-pound teaching block called The Spectrum, which was completed during the later part of 2009, with the first lessons taking place at the beginning of January 2010. The building was officially opened by quantum physicist Jim Al-Khalili OCE on Friday 23 April 2010. Drama and Music are located in the Central Studio, which plays host to a number of shows and performances all year round. In 2021, one floor of an existing building was converted to provide space for the new Esports BTEC qualification offered at the college.

QM Sports Centre
QM Sports Centre is located on the main college campus and, although open to the general public, is widely used by the college both as a sports centre and for educational reasons, with all physical education taking place here. The centre's main facilities are a  hall and a  swimming pool. The centre itself also incorporates a fitness centre and viewing gallery and also makes use of the college's various football, rugby and artificial turfed pitches.

Central Studio
Central Studio is a professional theatre located on the college campus. While the college's various departments use the facilities of Central Studio, including the bar, theatre, dance studio and recording facilities the building itself is often used to host various professional productions and concerts. In 2009, Central Studio put on a production of 'The Laramie Project', a play about an American youth who was killed for his sexuality. Westboro Church planned to picket outside the college in protest, but were banned from the UK as a precaution against inciting hatred.

In 1978 Peter Cushing was present at the official opening of Central studio where students presented a number of theatrical and musical performances.

Curriculum
Queen Mary's College offers AS and A-level courses in 40 different subjects, as well as several vocational courses and BTEC national diplomas.

The college has approximately 2400 students (the majority aged between 16 and 19) enrolled on full-time courses. It also offers a range of Adult Education opportunities, and has over 1000 students enrolled on part-time courses. The majority of students come from the Basingstoke and Deane & Hart areas.

Notable alumni
Sarah Beeny - broadcaster
Shelley Conn - actress
Monty Don - horticulturist
E O Higgins - writer and podcaster
Elizabeth Hurley - actress
Ramon Tikaram - actor
Tanita Tikaram - singer/songwriter
Alex Thomson - journalist
Kathy Smallwood-Cook - olympic sprinter
James Bye (actor) - actor
Jeff Minter - video game designer

References

External links

Central Studio
QM Sports Centre
2003 Ofsted Report
Queen Mary's College Students' Union website

Basingstoke
Sixth form colleges in Hampshire